I Can Do That may refer to:
"I Can Do That" (Montell Jordan song) (1988)
"I Can Do That" (A Chorus Line song) (1975)
"I Can Do That" (American TV series) (2015)
"I Can Do That" (Indian TV series), a 2015 reality television series
"I Can Do That" (Philippine TV series), a 2017 reality television series
"I Can Do That!", an episode of Barney and Friends